The 2022 Bommarito Automotive Group 500 was the fifteenth round of the 2022 IndyCar season. The race was held on August 20, 2022, in Madison, Illinois at the World Wide Technology Raceway. The race consisted of 260 laps and was won by Josef Newgarden.

Entry list

Practice

Practice 1

Qualifying

Qualifying classification 

 Notes
 Bold text indicates fastest time set in session.

Final practice

Race 
The race was originally scheduled to start at 6:30PM ET on August 20, 2022, however officials elected to move the start time to 6:01 PM ET in anticipation of adverse weather conditions due to arrive later in the evening.

The race was red-flagged at 7:55PM ET on lap 213 due to rain falling on the circuit. The red flag remained until the track had dried out enough for racing to resume, which happened over two hours later at 10:09PM ET.

Race classification

Championship standings after the race 

Drivers' Championship standings

Engine manufacturer standings

 Note: Only the top five positions are included.

Footnotes

References

Bommarito Automotive Group 500
Bommarito Automotive Group 500
Bommarito Automotive Group 500
Bommarito Automotive Group 500